Eye Candy is the second and final studio album by British girl group Mis-Teeq. It was released by Telstar Records on 29 March 2003 in the United Kingdom. As with their previous album Lickin' on Both Sides (2001), the trio worked with producers StarGate, Ed Case, Mushtaq, and Rishi Rich on the majority of the album, but also consulted new collaborators such as Dave Kelly, Salaam Remi and singer Joe. Musically, Eye Candy took the band's sound further into the contemporary R&B genre, combining pop and soul music with heavy hip hop, garage and reggae elements.

Upon release, the album receiced generally positive reviews. It debuted and peaked at number six on the UK Albums Chart and reached number 11 on the Scottish Albums Chart, eventually reaching gold status in the United Kingdom where its sales exceeded 100,000 units in April 2004. Eye Candy produced three singles, including the Blaque cover "Can't Get It Back" and lead single "Scandalous" which became a hit throughout Europe and Oceania and enjoyed success on the US Billboard charts, as well as "Style" which appeared on a reissue of the album. Eye Candy was the final album of Mis-Teeq who disbanded after the demise of their record label Telstar Records in 2005.

Background
Mis-Teeq reteamed with much of the same team that had worked with them on their previous album Lickin' on Both Sides (2001) to produce their second album. When asked about the background of Eye Candy, band member Su-Elise Nash commented: "I would say it's extremely diverse, we worked with a lot of the producers from the first album, like Stargate and also Ed Case to bring that garage flavor back in. And we worked with Dave Kelly who does a lot of the production for all the Shaggy stuff. It's been very successful and this album is a lot more R&B dominated than Lickin which was more equally balanced with the garage and the R&B. Eye Candy is very much R&B but within that there are so many urban influences, the garage element, hip hop a much greater reggae aspect and an element of bhangra."

Critical reception

In his review for The Guardian, Dave Simpson wrote that Eye Candy "documents Mis-Teeq's post-fame rollercoaster with breathless, Hard Day's Night-type detail. It's a life every girl dreams of - being whisked from club to party and at least two hours in make-up - but behind the dream lies the reality of "dawn to dusk in the studio" and brittle personal relationships. Such candour makes Eye Candy a sharp career move, but one with humanity and depth. And that title is clearly an ironic in-joke: on the cover, Mis-Teeq preen prettily with waxed legs, but inside, they prove their worth." BBC Music critic Bren O'Callaghan found that "veering between underground and packaged pop, each track on Eye Candy evades definition from one to the next or even partway through [...] It's exactly this type of mix that should stand them in good stead with clubbers and DJs alike. They have mainstream appeal, as they pout and strut for the cameras, and they have credible content for unlikely dance floor fusions."

Chart performance
Eye Candy debuted and peaked at number six on the UK Albums Chart, and reached number 11 on the Scottish Albums Chart. The Official Charts Company ranked it 83rd on the 2003 UK year-end chart. The album was certified silver and gold by the British Phonographic Industry (BPI), indicating sales in excess of 100,000 copies.

Track listing
 

Notes
 signifies a co-producer

Charts

Weekly charts

Year-end charts

Certifications

References

2003 albums
Mis-Teeq albums
Albums produced by Stargate
Albums produced by Salaam Remi